Maritime Polynesian Pidgin was a Polynesian-based pidgin that was the main contact language for European exploratory and whaling expeditions to the Pacific before the establishment of pidgin English, which dated to a century after the Cook expeditions. Drechsel (2014) concludes that reduced forms of Tahitian, Māori and Hawaiian, which may have predated European contact, were grammatically similar and mutually intelligible, and with European exploration merged into a regional contact language that would later be used for trade, as well as between European and Polynesian members of the crews in preference to English.

See also
 Pidgin Hawaiian

References

Pidgins and creoles
Hawaiian language
Māori language
Polynesian languages
Exploration of the Pacific Ocean